The 1977 Pacific Conference Games was the third edition of the international athletics competition between five Pacific coast nations: Australia, Canada, Japan, New Zealand and the United States. It was held on 3 and 4 December in Canberra, Australia.  A total of 20 men's and 14 women's athletics events were contested. Two new women's events were added to the programme of the previous edition: the 400 metres hurdles and the 4×400 metres relay. The relay event had gained Olympic status in 1972, but the inclusion of the women's hurdles event was ahead of its time as it was not held at the Olympics until seven years later.

It marked the first major international athletics event to be held in the country since the 1962 British Empire and Commonwealth Games. The venue, Bruce Stadium, was purpose-built for the competition and represented a new, modern stadium for the sport in Australia. The stadium later went on to host the 1985 IAAF World Cup. The area's sporting reputation grew with the opening of the Australian Institute of Sport nearby in 1981.

Medal summary

Men

Women

References

Medalists
Pacific Conference Games. GBR Athletics. Retrieved on 2015-01-14.
Australia at the Games Pacific Conference Games - 1977 Canberra, Australia . Athletics Australia. Retrieved on 2015-01-15.

External links
Opening ceremony guidelines from the organising committee

Pacific Conference Games
Pacific Conference Games
International athletics competitions hosted by Australia
Pacific Conference Games
Pacific Conference Games
Sports competitions in Canberra